Rozstání is a town in the Liberec Region, Czech Republic.

Populated places in Liberec District
Cities and towns in the Czech Republic